Alicia Moffet (born July 22, 1998) is a Quebec singer who won the 2013 season of The Next Star. She has released a number of singles and featured on the 2015 edition of the French-Canadian version of The Voice.

Career
Moffet has been singing since 2008. In May 2013, Moffet auditioned for The Next Star. She got a golden ticket and was accepted into the top 13. She made top 9 in late June 2013. She was chosen to be in the top six and crowned winner of season 6 on September 22, 2013, at Canada's Wonderland, where the live season finale was held.

Moffet released her own single during The Next Star broadcast, entitled "Better Watch Out for Me" released September 16, 2013. Together with the other contestants, she recorded the single "We Just Don't Care", released September 9, 2013. On September 23, 2013, at the live show she performed "We Just Don't Care", "Better Watch Out for Me" and the 'winners song' "Roar" by Katy Perry. She was crowned winner with over 3 million votes, receiving as a prize the chance to record a single licensed by Sony Music Canada.

In March 2014, Sony released the single "Why Do Boys Lie" (Pourquoi Mentir). At the beginning of 2015 Moffet featured on La Voix (Canada).

She released her first album Billie Ave. on June 26, 2020. Some of the songs were written with other artists, including Milk & Bone and Jonathan Roy.

Then, in early 2022, the artist released her second album, Intertwine. In her opinion, this second album is a perfect reflection of herself and who she truly is.

Personal life
Alicia started dating Alexandre Mentink on June 1, 2018. On July 20, 2019, Alicia and Alexandre became parents for the first time. Alicia gave birth to a baby girl named Billie Lou Mentink. However, in December 2021, she announced her breakup on social media according to the Narcity Quebec blog.

On January 22, 2020, Alicia had a breast reduction. After more than four years of reflection, she decided to take action. She wanted to undergo the surgery because she simply didn't feel comfortable with her large breasts, especially after the birth of Billie. She was also receiving comments about her breasts that made her feel uncomfortable.

Filmography

Discography

Studio albums

Singles

| 2022 || "Winter Wonderland"  || Alicia Moffet

Charted singles

Albums

References

1998 births
Living people
Canadian women pop singers
Participants in Canadian reality television series
Musicians from Quebec City
Singers from Quebec
21st-century Canadian women singers